The 1999 Crystal Skate of Romania was the 1st edition of an annual senior-level international figure skating competition held in Romania. It was held between January 14 and 16, 2000 in Bucharest. Skaters competed in the disciplines of men's singles and ladies' singles.

Results

Men

Ladies

External links
 results

Crystal Skate Of Romania, 1999
2000 in figure skating